The 1977 PGA Tour season was played from January 6 to November 6. The season consisted of 45 official money events. Tom Watson won the most tournaments, five, and there were 10 first-time winners. The tournament results and award winners are listed below.

Schedule
The following table lists official events during the 1977 season.

Unofficial events
The following events were sanctioned by the PGA Tour, but did not carry official money, nor were wins official.

Awards

Notes

See also
Fall 1976 PGA Tour Qualifying School graduates
Spring 1977 PGA Tour Qualifying School graduates

External links
PGA Tour official site
1977 season coverage at golfstats.com

PGA Tour seasons
PGA Tour